George Burrows may refer to:

George Man Burrows (1771–1846), English physician
Sir George Burrows, 1st Baronet (1801–1887), English physician
George Burrows (Indian Army officer) (1827–1917)
George B. Burrows (1832–1909), Wisconsin State Senator
George Burrows (swimmer) (1910–1987), Canadian swimmer
George Burrows (cricketer) (born 1998), English cricketer

See also
George Burroughs (1650s–1692), executed in Salem witch trials
George Burrough (1907–1965), English cricketer
Burrows (surname)